Soft support is a phrase used in politics to describe the volatility of support for a candidate among voters. The concept of soft support is one that is used to discredit any recorded measures of support for a candidate, including preference polls, campaign infrastructure, media and fundraising strength, which may or may not be reflected in an election by hard votes. The term soft supporter, also known as a swing voter, refers to a person who states support for a candidate but is likely to change their mind.

The reasons for a candidate's support to be called "soft" is due to many factors. In general, voters are not equally engaged or interested in politics or an election and do not share the same exposure to information or political advertising; even many well-engaged voters change their preference for a candidate or remain undecided during a race. No voter commitment exists for any candidate on a ballot; voters are free to change their minds and may develop their voting decisions up to and including on election day.

In opinion polling, voters are frequently asked for their choice from among a list of candidates; a candidate who is not listed as a choice may be less likely to receive unprompted support during a political poll, and methods of push polling can persuade a voter towards choosing a certain candidate from a list. Surveys and opinion polling is made less reliable by social desirability bias, whereby respondents will report answers in public that may not share their personal views if they believe they are in the minority. Voters are also subject to stating support for candidates that are well-known and recognizable, although they may not have the enthusiasm and commitment to the candidate necessary to generate a vote. Ronald Reagan was noted as having soft support because his 1980 presidential campaign enjoyed leads in opinion polling because he was a famous actor; his campaigning during the early months was casual and infrequent, and was vulnerable to a more aggressive candidate. During the 1984 Democratic Party presidential primaries, Walter Mondale had notoriously soft support among voters, and his opponents Reubin Askew and  Gary Hart scored several upset victories over him despite political polling showing Mondale as a definite frontrunner. At one point in the campaign Askew told reporters, "The support Mondale has in Florida and frankly throughout the nation is still very soft. The election is still winnable even though the polls show (otherwise)."

References

Political terminology
Election campaign terminology